OCG may refer to:

 Operation Clean Government, a citizens' lobby and advocacy organization in the United States
 Orchestre de chambre de Genève, a Swiss orchestra
 City of Granada Orchestra (Orquesta Ciudad de Granada), a Spanish orchestra
 Organized crime group
 Orthodox Church of the Gauls
 Occipital gyri (OcG), a structure in the brain